Khürelbaataryn Khash-Erdene (born 14 November 1983) is a Mongolian cross-country skier who has competed since 2003. Competing in two Winter Olympics, he earned his best finish of 85th in the 15 km event at Turin in 2006.

Khash-Erdene's best finish at the FIS Nordic World Ski Championships was 72nd in the individual sprint event at Oberstdorf in 2005.

His best World Cup finish was 77th in an individual sprint event at Italy in 2009.

References

www.sports-reference.com

1983 births
Cross-country skiers at the 2006 Winter Olympics
Cross-country skiers at the 2010 Winter Olympics
Living people
Mongolian male cross-country skiers
Olympic cross-country skiers of Mongolia
Cross-country skiers at the 2003 Asian Winter Games
21st-century Mongolian people